Palpifer hopponis is a moth of the family Hepialidae. It is found in Taiwan.

References

Moths described in 1931
Hepialidae